El Pozo Station is a Cercanías station in Vallecas neighborhood (Madrid). It was opened on July 15, 1992, and it is located in El Pozo area. It belongs to lines C-2 and C-7 of Cercanías Madrid.

On the morning of March 11, 2004, a double-decker commuter train exploded with two bombs at this station, thus killing 67 people. It was later discovered that the Islamic terrorist cell Al-Qaeda was behind the attack.

Cercanías Madrid stations
Railway stations in the Community of Madrid
Railway stations in Spain opened in 1992